Yukagir (Cükeegir) is a rural locality (a selo), the only inhabited locality and the administrative center of Yukagirsky National (Nomadic) Rural Okrug of Ust-Yansky District in the Sakha Republic, Russia, located  from Deputatsky, the administrative center of the district. Its population as of the 2010 Census was 154, of whom 84 were male and 70 female, up from 106 recorded during the 2002 Census. The village shares its name with the Yukaghir people who were indigenous to this region.

See also

References

Notes

Sources
Official website of the Sakha Republic. Registry of the Administrative-Territorial Divisions of the Sakha Republic. Ust-Yansky District. 

Rural localities in Ust-Yansky District